Clyde Common was a restaurant and market in Portland, Oregon, United States. The business opened in 2007. In 2020, Clyde Common closed temporarily due to the COVID-19 pandemic, reopening in July with outdoor dining and as a market. The bar and restaurant became known as Clyde Tavern, and the part of the former dining area was called Common Market. Clyde Common closed permanently in January 2022.

The restaurant's bar, as led by Jeffrey Morgenthaler, was influential in its creations and helped lead the craft cocktail movement.

Description and history

Matt Piacentini and Nate Tilden are co-owners. They opened the restaurant in the ground floor of the Ace Hotel (formerly the Clyde Hotel) in downtown Portland in 2007. Tilden also owns part of the restaurant and meat company Olympia Provisions. In May 2014, Carlo Lamagna replaced Johnny Leach as head chef.

In 2020, the restaurant closed temporarily during the COVID-19 pandemic. Clyde Common re-opened in July with outdoor seating and as a market. Chis DiMinno served as executive chef.

Clyde Common closed permanently in January 2022.

Reception
Clyde Common was a semifinalist in the James Beard Foundation Award's Outstanding Bar category in 2012, 2013, and 2015, and a finalist in the same category in 2014 and each year from 2016 to 2018. The restaurant was included in The Oregonian 2017 list of Portland's best restaurants. In late 2018, Brian Panganiban of Willamette Week said, "This downtown stalwart is still a hub for good food and a prime place for people watching... Clyde remains quintessential Portland cool." Joe Streckert included Clyde Common in Portland Mercury 2019 list of "100 Portland Happy Hours: Downtown".

See also

 COVID-19 pandemic in Portland, Oregon
Impact of the COVID-19 pandemic on the restaurant industry in the United States
 List of defunct restaurants of the United States

References

External links

 
 Clyde Common at Fodor's
 Clyde Common at Lonely Planet
 Clyde Common at Portland Mercury
 Clyde Common at Thrillist
 Clyde Common at Zagat

2007 establishments in Oregon
2022 disestablishments in Oregon
Defunct drinking establishments in Oregon
Defunct restaurants in Portland, Oregon
Restaurants disestablished during the COVID-19 pandemic
Restaurants disestablished in 2022
Restaurants established in 2007
Southwest Portland, Oregon